Lifted is the second studio album by Australian songwriter and record producer Hayden James. The album was released on 8 April 2022.

The album will be supported by the Australian and New Zealand Lifted Tour, commencing in Brisbane in August 2022.

Background and release
James began working on Lifted in "late 2020" after the COVID-19 pandemic stopped him from touring. He told Triple J "The result is a huge emotional, energetic dance record, with elements of piano-house, melodic house and a positive tone and feel that can be found across all tracks. When I write an album, everything has a place and a purpose, and it's all part of the bigger story. I'm so happy with the journey of this album."

The album was announced via James' twitter on 19 January 2022, where he released the cover art and release date of 8 April 2022.

Track listing

Charts

References

2022 albums
Hayden James albums